is a professional Japanese baseball player. He plays pitcher for the Yomiuri Giants.

References 

1994 births
Living people
Baseball people from Hiroshima Prefecture
Kindai University alumni
Japanese baseball players
Nippon Professional Baseball pitchers
Yomiuri Giants players